Gurthunda Seethakalam is a 2022 Indian Telugu-language romantic drama film directed by Nagashekar. A remake of the 2020 Kannada film Love Mocktail, it stars Satyadev and Tamannaah. The plot follows a middle-aged software employee, who endures several heartbreaks in his quest to find his true love.

Gurthunda Seethakalam began its production in August 2020. The film was delayed multiple times since February 2022. At finally, the film was theatrically released on 9 December 2022.

Cast 
 Satyadev as Satyadev "Dev"
 Tamannaah as Nidhi
 Megha Akash as Divya
 Kavya Shetty as Amrutha
Suhasini Maniratnam
Priyadarshi as Prashanth, Dev's friend
Harshini as Geetha, Prashanth's wife

Production 
Gurthunda Seethakalam is the Telugu remake of the 2020 Kannada film Love Mocktail. The film was formally launched in August 2020, with second schedule taking place in Hyderabad in December 2020. Megha Akash and Kavya Shetty were also cast for the film.

Music 
The music is composed by Kaala Bhairava.

1) "Gurthundha Seethakalam Title Track" - Sanjith Hegde

2) "Anaganaganaga" - Sonu Nigam

3) "Suhasini" - Armaan Malik

4) "Seethala Kaalam" - Shreya Ghoshal

Release
Gurthunda Seethakalam was postponed several times. It was previously scheduled to be released on 23 September 2022. Initially, the film was scheduled to be released in February 2022. It was later pushed back multiple times to June 2022, July and August 2022.At finally, the film was theatrically released on 09 December 2022.

The film was premiered on Amazon Prime Video on 20 January 2023.

References

External links 
 

Films scored by Kaala Bhairava
Indian romantic drama films
Telugu remakes of Kannada films
Upcoming films